Vildhallon (English: Wild raspberry) is a music album recorded by the Swedish-Dutch folk singer-songwriter Cornelis Vreeswijk in 1979.

Track listing

"Vildhallon (Första brevet till Mäster Sändh)" - 3:13
"Billet d'amour till J.M." - 2:05
"Rosa, skola vi dansa?" - 2:26
"Balladen om den nya äktenskapslagen" - 3:04
"Till Svenska Akademien" - 2:31
"Fagermans visa" - 3:00
"Ballad till en bra polis" - 2:52
"Nu dagas det i öster" - 3:34
"Min tanke är fri" - 2:50
"Byt nu ton" - 1:53
"Ballad om Don Quixotes förvillelser" - 5:53
"Assistenten samtalar med Fredrik Åkare" - 5:42
"Christiania" - 5:32
"Bön" - 4:54

Cornelis Vreeswijk albums
1979 albums